The Secretary of State for the European Union (SEUE) is a senior official of the Ministry of Foreign Affairs, European Union and Cooperation of the Government of Spain. The SEUE is appointed by the Monarch with the advice of the Foreign Minister.

The Secretary of State for the European Union is responsible for the formulation and execution of the policy of Spain within the European Union. Likewise, he assists the Foreign Minister in the formulation and execution of the foreign policy of Spain in the geographical area corresponding to the countries of the European Union, candidate countries, countries of the European Economic Area and other European countries.

As the highest official after the Foreign Minister in European Union affairs, the Secretary of State is responsible for overseen the actions of the different bodies of the different national administrations within the European Union as well as overseen and give orders to the Permanent Representative of Spain to the European Union.

History
The origin of this secretariat of state dates back to July 26, 1977 when prime minister Adolfo Suárez officially applied for admission of Spain in the European Communities, three days after the Cortes Generales approved it.

To start the negotiations, the prime minister created in July 1978 a Ministry for the Relations with the European Communities and appointed Leopoldo Calvo-Sotelo as minister. The negotiations started on February 5, 1979. Eduard Punset succeeded Calvo-Sotelo in the Ministry in 1980 until 1981, when the Ministry was suppressed and was degraded to a secretariat of state within the Ministry of Foreign Affairs.

After this, the Foreign Minister Fernando Morán López assumed a main role in the negotiations being supported by the Secretary of State for Relations with the European Communities, culminating in the signing of the accession agreement in June 1985 and entry into force in January 1986. Before all of this process, in 1962, Spain already requested the accession but was rejected because the country was under a dictatorship.

With the entrance of Spain in the Union, the country quickly became one of the most important and influential countries of the EU by assuming important offices such as High Representative for the Common Foreign and Security Policy with Javier Solana and the Presidency of the European Parliament with Josep Borrell and Manuel Marín (being considered the father of the Erasmus Programme).

The first and second Secretaries of State had to work with a very small staff because this department originally was devised as an auxiliary body to the Minister in the accession negotiations but in 1985 an important reform was carried out in the Foreign Ministry. With the entry in the Union, the Secretariat of State was focused not in negotiations affairs but in coordination between the Spanish administrations and the European institutions.

With the change of government in 1996, the new prime minister elevated the category of the General Secretariat for Foreign Policy to Secretariat of State and merged it with the Secretariat of State for European Communities, being responsible not only for the relations with the European Union but the rest of the world.

In 2000, the secretariat of state split in two and this one was renamed «for European Affairs». In 2004 was adopted the current denomination «for the European Union», that was briefly changed between 2017 and 2018 «for European Affairs» but recovered by the Sánchez government.

Names
 Secretary of State for Relations with the European Communities (1981–1985)
 Secretary of State for the European Communities (1985–1995)
 Secretary of State for the European Union (1995–1996)
 Secretary of State for Foreign Policy and for the European Union (1996–2000)
 Secretary of State for European Affairs (2000–2004)
 Secretary of State for the European Union (2004–2017)
 Secretary of State for European Affairs (2017–2018)
 Secretary of State for the European Union (2018–present)

Structure
The Secretariat of State is composed of three departments, all of them run by a Director-General:
 The Directorate-General for Integration and Coordination of General Affairs of the European Union.
 It's the department responsible for following the European Union policies and coordinate the national departments that collaborate in that policies; for establishing the Spanish position regarding these policies and the preparation of the meetings of the EU General Affairs Council. It is also responsible for overseeing the regional governments actions in the EU; to study the European Union reform proposals as wells as the possible enlargement or withrawal of member states and the promotion of the Spanish language and the presence of Spanish citizents in the European institutions.
 The Directorate-General for the Coordination of the Internal Market and other Community Policies
 It's the department in charge of following the European Union policies and coordinate the national departments that collaborate in that policies along with the Directorate-General for Integration and Coordination of General Affairs of the European Union; the management before the EU institutions of public aids and the following of and the advisement about the European Union law and the actings before the CJEU in coordination with the Office of the Solicitor General. It also prepares the meetings of the EU Competitiveness Council and the EU Internal Market Consultative Committee.
 The Directorate-General for Western, Central and Southeast Europe
 It's the department responsible for the proposal and execution of the Spanish foreign policy over this geographical area and the momentum of bilateral relations with these countries. It's responsible also for the proposal and following of the position of Spain over the Gibraltar dispute in coordination with other departments of the Administration.

From the Secretariat of State also depends organically the Solicitor's Office before the Court of Justice of the European Union although functionally depends from the Solicitor General Office and the Ministry of Justice.

List of SEUE

References

Secretaries of State of Spain
Spain and the European Union
Foreign ministers of Spain